Studina is a commune in Olt County, Oltenia, Romania. It is composed of two villages, Studina and Studinița. It included three other villages until 2004, when they were split off to form Grădinile Commune.

References

Communes in Olt County
Localities in Oltenia